Shao Weigang (born February 21, 1973) is a Chinese professional Go player.

Biography 
Shao started to learn Go at the age of 8. By 1986, when he was 13, Shao turned professional. Over 12 years, he was promoted to 9 dan. He currently resides in China.

Titles & runners-up

References 

1973 births
Living people
Go players from Shanghai